Fernand Etgen (born 10 March 1957) is a Luxembourg politician of the Democratic Party (DP) who has been President of the Chamber of Deputies since 2018.

Biography

Studies and formation
Etgen completed his secondary school studies at the Lycée classique of Diekirch from 1971 to 1977.

Professional life
Aside from his political career, Etgen is a civil servant working for the Registration Duties, Estates and VAT Authority.

Political life
Following the 2013 general election, Etgen entered the government as Minister for Agriculture, Viticulture and the Protection of consumers, as well as Minister for Parliament relations on 4 December 2013 within the coalition government between the Democratic Party (DP), Luxembourgish Socialist Worker's Party (LSAP) and the Greens (déi gréng).

Other political functions
Joining the DP in 1979, Etgen became a member of the communal council of Feulen from 1979 to 1981 and from 1988 to 1993, and an alderman from 1982 to 1987. In 1994, he became mayor, a function he occupied until he joined the government on 4 December 2013.

At the national level, Etgen joined the Chamber of Deputies in 2007. There, he occupied, among others, the functions of vice president of the commission for Public function and Administrative reform, of Media and Communication et of the commission for Public works. He was elected to the Chamber of Deputies on the DP's list in the North constituency in 2009. He was vice president of the commission for Internal Affairs, of the Greater Region and of Police, of the commission for Agriculture, Viticulture and Rural development as well as of the commission for Public function and Administrative simplification from 2009 to 2013.

Etgen was the DP's general secretary from 2010 to 2014.

References

Living people
1957 births
Chamber of Deputies (Luxembourg)
Democratic Party (Luxembourg) politicians
People from Ettelbruck